Background extinction rate, also known as the normal extinction rate, refers to the standard rate of extinction in Earth's geological and biological history before humans became a primary contributor to extinctions. This is primarily the pre-human extinction rates during periods in between major extinction events.

Overview

Extinctions are a normal part of the evolutionary process, and the background extinction rate is a measurement of "how often" they naturally occur.  Normal extinction rates are often used as a comparison to present day extinction rates, to illustrate the higher frequency of extinction today than in all periods of non-extinction events before it.

Background extinction rates have not remained constant, although changes are measured over geological time, covering millions of years.

Measurement

Background extinction rates are typically measured in three different ways.  The first is simply the number of species that normally go extinct over a given period of time.  For example, at the background rate one species of bird will go extinct every estimated 400 years.  Another way the extinction rate can be given is in million species years (MSY).  For example, there is approximately one extinction estimated per million species years.  From a purely mathematical standpoint this means that if there are a million species on the planet earth, one would go extinct every year, while if there was only one species it would go extinct in one million years, etc.  The third way is in giving species survival rates over time.  For example, given normal extinction rates species typically exist for 5–10 million years before going extinct.

Lifespan estimates
Some species lifespan estimates by taxonomy are given below (Lawton & May 1995).

References

Further reading
E. O. Wilson. 2005. The Future of Life. Alfred A. Knopf. New York, New York, USA
C.Michael Hogan. 2010. Edenic Period. Encyclopedia of Earth. National Council for Science and Environment. ed. Galal Hassan, ed in chief Cutler Cleveland, Washington DC
J.H.Lawton and R.M.May (2005) Extinction rates, Oxford University Press, Oxford.

External links
  Discussion of extinction events, with description of Background extinction rates

Extinction
Temporal rates